Cephetola subcoerulea, the Roche's epitola, is a butterfly in the family Lycaenidae. It is found in the Gambia, Senegal (Basse Casamance), Sierra Leone, Ivory Coast, Ghana, eastern Nigeria, Cameroon and Equatorial Guinea (Bioko). Its habitat consists of forests.

References

Butterflies described in 1954
Poritiinae